Ironwood Charter Township is a charter township of Gogebic County in the U.S. state of Michigan. The population was 2,333 at the 2010 census.  The city of Ironwood borders on the south, but the two are administered autonomously.

Ironwood Township is the home of Gogebic Community College, as well as the Gogebic–Iron County Airport.  Most of the land in the township is within the Ottawa National Forest. The Montreal River forms the township's western boundary with Wisconsin. Ironwood Charter Township is the westernmost municipality in the state of Michigan. It is also the largest charter township by land area and the least-densely populated charter township in the state.

Geography

Demographics
As of the census of 2000, there were 2,330 people, 1,024 households, and 699 families residing in the township.  The population density was 13.3 per square mile (5.1/km2).  There were 1,609 housing units at an average density of 9.2 per square mile (3.5/km2).  The racial makeup of the township was 97.38% White, 0.04% African American, 0.69% Native American, 0.17% Asian, 0.90% from other races, and 0.82% from two or more races. Hispanic or Latino of any race were 1.33% of the population. 27.5% were of Finnish, 13.5% Italian, 9.8% German, 8.6% Swedish, 7.0% English, 5.5% Irish and 5.1% Polish ancestry according to Census 2000.

There were 1,024 households, out of which 25.2% had children under the age of 18 living with them, 58.3% were married couples living together, 6.9% had a female householder with no husband present, and 31.7% were non-families. 28.3% of all households were made up of individuals, and 15.2% had someone living alone who was 65 years of age or older.  The average household size was 2.27 and the average family size was 2.76.

In the township the population was spread out, with 20.7% under the age of 18, 6.9% from 18 to 24, 24.1% from 25 to 44, 27.4% from 45 to 64, and 20.9% who were 65 years of age or older.  The median age was 44 years. For every 100 females, there were 95.5 males.  For every 100 females age 18 and over, there were 94.3 males.

The median income for a household in the township was $36,053, and the median income for a family was $42,311. Males had a median income of $31,538 versus $20,179 for females. The per capita income for the township was $18,702.  About 7.5% of families and 10.5% of the population were below the poverty line, including 14.1% of those under age 18 and 10.1% of those age 65 or over.

References

External links
Ironwood Township official website

Townships in Gogebic County, Michigan
Charter townships in Michigan
Michigan populated places on Lake Superior